Rhynchospora chinensis, known by the common name of spiked beaksedge, is a member of the sedge family, Cyperaceae. It is a perennial herb, found in wetlands of Japan, Korea, eastern China, Mainland Southeast Asia, India, Australia, and Madagascar. It was once present in Sri Lanka, where it is now locally extinct. The subspecies R. chinensis subsp. spiciformis is endemic to Hawaii.

Rhynchospora chinensis grows approximately 12 inches tall, and may be found in bogs or wet areas in open pastures. Its greenish-brown spikelets bloom year-round.

References

External links

chinensis
Flora of Hawaii
Flora of Japan
Flora of South Korea
Flora of North Korea
Flora of China
Flora of Indo-China
Flora of India (region)
Flora of Australia
Flora of Madagascar
Plants described in 1834